The 1994–95 Liga Indonesia Premier Division (known as the Liga Dunhill for sponsorship reasons) was the inaugural season of the Liga Indonesia Premier Division, the top division of Indonesian football following the merger of Perserikatan and Galatama. The season began on 27 November 1994 and ended on 30 July 1995. The league was made up of 34 clubs. Persib won the title after beating Petrokimia Putra 1–0 in the final.

Overview

Background 
The league started in 1994. The lack of ticket sales in Galatama and the lack of commercial aspects in Perserikatan made PSSI take a bold decision. The Indonesian football association decided to form a new fully professional league called the Liga Indonesia Premier Division as a merger of Galatama and Perserikatan.

Due to the merger, there were 34 inaugural clubs in the league. Two clubs that should have been relegated to the First Division, Persiba and PS Bengkulu were allowed to compete while PS Aceh Putra chose to withdraw. To solve this issue, the league is split into two regional divisions with each division consisting 17 clubs. The top four clubs from each division then entered the second stage which is played in a group stage format consisting of two groups of four. Then, the top two clubs from each group proceed to the knockout stage (semifinals and final) where they will play for the title.

The shift of the league to a more commercial form has made PSSI move to find sponsors to sustain the wheels of the league. Dunhill, a cigarette manufacturer from the UK is the first company to dive in and become the inaugural title sponsor of the league. As a result of this sponsorship, Dunhill poured funds up to Rp4.5 billion per season and provided subsidies of Rp100 million for each Premier Division club. Dunhill also gave a prize of Rp75 million for the champions, Rp50 million for the runners-up, and Rp25 million for the league's best player. The funds provided by Dunhill were pretty high for financial standards in 1994. Thus, the Liga Indonesia Premier Division was then given the name Liga Dunhill.

Before the league started, PSSI also lifted the ban for foreign players to compete in the league that was active since 1982. This resulted in some high-profile signings with clubs signing seasoned veterans of the world stage.

Season summary 
The inaugural duel of this brand-new league brought together the champions of the last edition from each competition on 27 November 1994. Pelita Jaya were the last winners of Galatama while Persib were winners of the 1993–94 Perserikatan. The match ended 1–0 for Pelita Jaya with their Montenegrin striker Dejan Gluščević becoming the first player to score a goal in the new top-flight in the 60th minute.  By the end of the first stage, PS Bengkulu, Warna Agung, PSIR, and PSIM were the clubs that were relegated from the league. The first wave of foreign players coming to league proved to be ineffective in improving results, leading to clubs reshuffling the foreign players they had within their squads right before the second stage began.

Persib would eventually become the inaugural champions of the league. The Maung Bandung, who only finished as runners-up in the West Division, won the title thanks to a narrow 1–0 victory over Petrokimia Putra in the final held in Gelora Senayan Main Stadium on 30 July 1995. The final was not without controversy however as Petrokimia striker Jacksen F. Tiago had a goal ruled out for offside at the 30th minute. Nevertheless, Sutiono Lamso scored later in the 76th minute for Persib and they held on to lead until the end of the game. Ironically, the title was won by a team consisting of local players only when most of the title challengers had at least one foreign player. Meanwhile, Bandung Raya striker Peri Sandria was the league's inaugural top scorer. The 34 goals he scored was a top-flight record which stood for 22 years until Sylvano Comvalius scored 37 goals in the 2017 Liga 1.

Teams

Stadiums and locations

Kits and sponsorship 
All of the teams kits are provided by Adidas and sponsored by Dunhill as part of the league's sponsorship deal.

First stage

West Division

</onlyinclude>

East Division

</onlyinclude>

Second stage
The second stage was played from 19–26 July 1995. The matches were held at Gelora Senayan Main Stadium in Jakarta.

Group A

Group B

Knockout stage

Semifinals

Final

Awards

Top scorers
The following is a list of the top scorers from the 1994–95 season.

Best player
 Widodo C. Putro (Petrokimia Putra)

References

External links
Indonesia - List of final tables (RSSSF)

Indonesian Premier Division seasons
1994–95 in Indonesian football
Indonesia
Top level Indonesian football league seasons